Hugo Patricio Droguett Diocares (born September 2, 1982) is a Chilean former football midfielder. He has also represented Chile internationally.

Club career 

Born in Santiago, Chile, Droguett started his career playing for Universidad Católica. A year later he signed for Deportes Temuco. On 2004, he joined  Universidad de Concepción, before join  Universidad de Chile in 2005.

After he played for Universidad de Chile , he signed with UAG Tecos from 2006 to 2008. Later, he played for Monarcas Morelia between 2008 and 2010.

He signed for Cruz Azul on November 26, 2010 to play for the club starting in the Clausura 2011 in the Primera División de México. Cruz Azul paid him $3 million that season.

On 24 February 2012, Droguett joined South Korean powerhouse Jeonbuk Hyundai Motors on a season-long loan deal.

In 2013, he played for Deportivo Cali of Colombia, and later in Chile for Cobreloa. On 2014 come back to South Korea, now playing for Jeju United, where played 36 matches and scored 10 goals.

On 23 December 2014, he returned to Chile, joining Santiago club  O'Higgins for the 2014–15 season.

In March 2022, Droguett announced his retirement from football after having played for Deportes Temuco in 2021.

International career 
Droguett represented Chile at under-17 level in the 1999 South American Championship and at under-20 level in the 2001 South American Championship.

On November 15, 2006, Droguett made his debut with the national team in a friendly versus Paraguay. He scored a goal against Austria in a friendly match played in the Ernst Happel Stadion.

Personal life 
His younger brother, Jaime, is also a professional footballer.

Career statistics

Club

References

External links 
 
 
 

1982 births
Living people
Footballers from Santiago
Chilean footballers
Chilean expatriate footballers
Chile international footballers
Chile youth international footballers
Chile under-20 international footballers
Chilean people of French descent
Club Deportivo Universidad Católica footballers
Deportes Temuco footballers
Universidad de Concepción footballers
Universidad de Chile footballers
Tecos F.C. footballers
Atlético Morelia players
Cruz Azul footballers
Jeonbuk Hyundai Motors players
Deportivo Cali footballers
Cobreloa footballers
Jeju United FC players
O'Higgins F.C. footballers
C.D. Antofagasta footballers
Chilean Primera División players
Primera B de Chile players
Liga MX players
K League 1 players
Categoría Primera A players
Expatriate footballers in Mexico
Expatriate footballers in South Korea
Expatriate footballers in Colombia
Chilean expatriate sportspeople in Mexico
Chilean expatriate sportspeople in South Korea
Chilean expatriate sportspeople in Colombia
Association football midfielders
Association football wingers